Italian immigration to Switzerland (unrelated to the indigenous Italian-speaking population in Ticino and Grigioni) is related to the Italian diaspora in Switzerland.

History
It began on a large scale in the late 19th century, although most of the immigrants that reached the country in that period eventually returned to Italy after the rise of Fascism. Future Italian leader Benito Mussolini himself emigrated in Switzerland in 1902, only to be deported after becoming involved in the socialist movement.

A new migratory wave began after 1945, favoured by the lax immigration laws then in force. At first the Swiss government encouraged the arrival of guest workers, assigning them different types of work permits, some forbidding job switching, ranging from the "frontaliere" permit given to Italians living near the Swiss border to the "C" permit granting the same status of a Swiss citizen minus the political rights.

In 1970 there were a million immigrants in Switzerland, 54% of whom were Italians. Rising friction with the indigenous majority even led to the creation of an "anti-Italians party" in 1963. As every other immigrant group at the time, Italians were faced with a policy of forced integration, later satirised in the highly successful 1978 comedy film Die Schweizermacher (literally "The Swissmakers"), which went on to become the fifth most-watched film of all time in Switzerland

Characteristics
Italian citizens remain the largest non-naturalized group (ca. 290,000, followed by 270,000 Germans). The total number of "ethnic Italians" in Switzerland is estimated at close to half a million, but there are no official statistics on ethnicity, and furthermore cultural assimilation and cross-marriage makes it difficult to determine who among the second or third generation descendants of Italian emigrants should be counted as "ethnic Italian".

As of 2008 there is a small resurfacing of Italian immigration, when after decades the migratory balance of Italians returned positive (2,213 new Italian immigrants to Switzerland).

See also
 James Schwarzenbach
 Swiss people in Italy

Notes and references

 
Switzerland
Switzerland
Immigration to Switzerland